Charles Henry "Chick" Agnew Jr. (August 11, 1894 – August 19, 1942) was an American football player and coach and college athletics administrator.  He grew up near Whitewater, Wisconsin, and attended Whitewater State Teachers College.  He was a star football and baseball player who received a bachelor's degree in 1917. He was the athletic director and head coach for the Whitewater State Teachers College athletic teams from February 1920 until his death from heart disease in August 1942 at age 48.

References

External links
 

1894 births
1942 deaths
Basketball coaches from Wisconsin
Wisconsin–Whitewater Warhawks athletic directors
Wisconsin–Whitewater Warhawks baseball coaches
Wisconsin–Whitewater Warhawks baseball players
Wisconsin–Whitewater Warhawks football coaches
Wisconsin–Whitewater Warhawks football players
Wisconsin–Whitewater Warhawks men's basketball coaches
People from Jefferson County, Wisconsin
Sportspeople from the Milwaukee metropolitan area